Józef Oleksy (22 June 1946 – 9 January 2015) was a Polish left-wing politician, former chairman of the Democratic Left Alliance (Sojusz Lewicy Demokratycznej, SLD).

Early life and education
In his youth he lived in Nowy Sącz, and was an altar boy at St. Margaret church. He graduated from Kazimierz Brodziński High School in Tarnów. Later on, he graduated from the Faculty of Foreign Trade of the Warsaw School of Planning and Statistics (currently SGH Warsaw School of Economics). He obtained a doctoral degree in economics. He was a dean and lecturer at the Faculty of International Relations at the SGH Warsaw School of Economics and the Vistula University in Warsaw.

Career

From 1968 to 1990 he was a member of the communist Polish United Workers' Party (PZPR). 
He was a member of the board of the main Socialist Union of Polish Students. He chaired the National Council of Young Scientists. He was the secretary of the PZPR University Committee at the Warsaw School of Planning and Statistics. In 1977 he went to work in party apparatus at the Department of Ideological and Educational Work of the Central Committee of the Polish United Workers' Party. From 1981 to the X Congress of the Party, he headed the office of the Central Committee of the Party. In 1987-1989 he was the First Secretary of the Provincial Party Committee in Biala Podlaska. In 1989, he served as Minister-Council member for cooperation with trade unions. In the same year he took part in the round table talks on the government side. Oleksy represented the Communist leadership in round table talks with the opposition Solidarity movement in early 1989.

In 1990 he was one of the founders of the Social Democracy of the Republic of Poland, he was the chairman of this party from 28 January 1996 to 6 December 1997, and co-founded the Democratic Left Alliance in 1999. In the years 1989–2005, he was the member of the Sejm.

In the years 1993-1995 he was the Marshal of the Sejm. From 7 March 1995 to 7 February 1996, he served as Prime Minister of Poland. He resigned after being accused by Interior Minister Andrzej Milczanowski for spying for Russia under the pseudonym "Olin". These allegations have never been confirmed.

In the years 2001-2005 he was a chairman of the European Union Committee in the Sejm which was responsible for aligning all Polish laws and regulations before Poland joined European Union in 2004. In 2004 he was a member of the European Parliament and the Convention on the Future of Europe, which was responsible to produce a draft constitution for the European Union for the European Council to finalise and adopt.

In early 2004 he took the office of the Minister of Internal Affairs. Between 21 April 2004 and 5 January 2005 he was the Marshal of the Sejm.

A record of a private conversation Jozef Oleksy had with one of Poland's richest businessmen Aleksander Gudzowaty "leaked" to the media on 22 March 2007. The tapes suggested corruption in the SLD party. Oleksy accused former president Aleksander Kwaśniewski of illegal financial procedures, and spoke very harshly of then SLD leader Wojciech Olejniczak and several other members of the party. He soon left the SLD.
He re-joined the SLD on 1 February 2010 and on 12 May 2012 he became vice-president of this party.

Private life

Józef Oleksy was married to Maria Oleksy. He had two children.

Since 2005 he had been struggling with cancer. He died on 9 January 2015. Funeral ceremonies with representatives of the state authorities, including President Bronisław Komorowski, Prime Minister Ewa Kopacz and Marshal of the Sejm Radosław Sikorski, took place on 16 January 2015 in the Field Cathedral of the Polish Army in Warsaw. Józef Oleksy was buried at the Powązki Military Cemetery.

Honours and awards

 : 
Grand Cross of the Order of Polonia Restituta (2015, posthumously)
Officer's Cross of the Order of Polonia Restituta 
Knight's Cross of the Order of Polonia Restituta (1984)
Silver Cross of Merit (1972)
Medal of Merit for National Defence
 : Grand Cross 1st Class Order of Merit of the Federal Republic of Germany
 :Grand Commander Cross of the Order for Merits to Lithuania (2004)

See also
Politics of Poland
List of political parties in Poland
List of politicians in Poland

References

External links

|-

|-

|-

|-

1946 births
2015 deaths
Prime Ministers of Poland
Deputy Prime Ministers of Poland
Marshals of the Sejm of the Third Polish Republic
Polish United Workers' Party members
Democratic Left Alliance politicians
Members of the Polish Sejm 1991–1993
Members of the Polish Sejm 1993–1997
Members of the Polish Sejm 1997–2001
Members of the Polish Sejm 2001–2005
People from Nowy Sącz
SGH Warsaw School of Economics alumni
Recipients of the Medal of Merit for National Defence
Interior ministers of Poland
Polish Round Table Talks participants
Grand Crosses with Star and Sash of the Order of Merit of the Federal Republic of Germany
Deaths from cancer in Poland